Tsentralno-Miskyi District is an urban district of the city of Horlivka in eastern Ukraine.

Urban districts of Horlivka